Ambachtsland is a station on Line B of the Rotterdam Metro and is situated in the Zevenkamp neighbourhood of Rotterdam. Near the station is Zevenkamp shopping mall, and also a community centre called Youngsters, where there is a church service every Sunday morning.

Rotterdam Metro stations
Railway stations opened in 1984
1984 establishments in the Netherlands
Railway stations in the Netherlands opened in the 20th century